The Glen Mills Schools is a youth detention center for juvenile delinquents located near Glen Mills in Thornbury Township, Delaware County, Pennsylvania, United States, for boys between 12 and 21 years of age. The school was founded in 1826 and was the oldest surviving school of its type in the United States providing services to approximately 200 delinquent boys, until all residents were ordered removed on March 25, 2019, by the Pennsylvania Department of Human Services. The school's licenses were subsequently revoked for not complying with the state's Human Services Code and regulations.

Previously, Glen Mills had been lauded as a "pathbreaking concept for modernizing failing reform schools in the United States". The St. Petersburg Times in 1996 called it "the country's most radical and, some say, its most effective answer yet to juvenile crime". and the New York Times praised its "culture that encourages self-discipline and a sense of mutual respect and responsibility". Juvenile courts in other states, such as California and Texas, along with various Pennsylvania jurisdictions, sent boys adjudged delinquent to Glen Mills Schools. Even troubled boys from other countries, such as Bermuda and Germany, were also sent there. Bermuda's Department of Child and Family Services, for example, sent boys to Glen Mills for more than 35 years between 1982–2017, paying almost $1.6 million to the school between 2001 and 2019. On the school's 125th Anniversary, it described itself as having "500 court-adjudicated male youth on an open residential campus, providing students with academics, vocational programs, character and leadership skill development, behavior services, athletics and recreation".

The school has denied allegations of mistreatment and has appealed the revocation of its licenses to the Pennsylvania DHS Bureau of Hearings and Appeals.

History 
The Glen Mills Schools is the oldest surviving school of its type in the United States, continuously providing services to troubled youth for almost 200 years. The institution was founded in 1826 in Philadelphia, Pennsylvania, as the Philadelphia House of Refuge. In 1892, the school relocated to its current campus in Glen Mills, Pennsylvania, and in 1911 changed its name to the present Glen Mills Schools.

Philosophy and leadership 
 Cosimo D. "Sam" Ferrainola, who served as the director of Glen Mills from 1975-2007, said that the school's social structure is,  "a system of social control borrowed directly from street gangs. [...] Which is why Glen Mills recruits gang members as students. They readily understand the power of peer pressure and the rewards of status. The big difference between a street gang and Glen Mills is that students aren't allowed to lay a hand on each other." Ferrainola was succeeded by Garry Ipock as executive director in 2007, who served in that capacity until 2012. Randy Ireson followed as executive director 2013–2019.

Campus 

For athletics, the school has the Hayes Recreation Center with indoor track, tennis and basketball courts, as well as a football stadium, baseball diamonds, and an Olympic size indoor swimming pool. The school's teams, called the "Battling Bulls", have won many championships competing in 15 varsity sports as a member of the Pennsylvania Interscholastic Athletic Association.

Influence on juvenile delinquency treatment elsewhere  
 In 1996 officials in Florida started plans to establish the Adam Paine Academy, modeled on Glen Mills. Community pressure led to an end of the plans in 1997.
 In Europe, the Netherlands and Germany adopted some of the Glen Mills philosophies after 1980. German psychologist Manfred Günther studied the school in 1979 and the famed German criminologist Jens Weidner developed a lot of Glen Mills' techniques (i.e. Gestalt therapy's "hot seat" and others) to use in German youth prisons like in Hameln.

Abuse allegations and license revocation
In Summer, 2018, the Philadelphia Inquirer reported that a youth had been beaten by a school counselor. In February 2019, it was reported that Glen Mills Schools had been abusing their students. It was said that conditions at the school “constitute gross incompetence, negligence, misconduct in operating a facility, including mistreatment and abuse of clients, likely to constitute immediate and serious danger to the life or health of the children in care." This prompted the Pennsylvania Department of Human Services to order an emergency removal of all students from the school on March 25, 2019. On April 8, 2019, Glen Mill's licenses were revoked by the Pennsylvania Department of Human Services for not complying with the state's Human Services Code and regulations. The school has appealed the state's action.

Glen Mills School is also the subject of an ongoing investigation or law enforcement proceeding at the U.S. Department of Justice in 2019.

Notable alumni
Ralph Jarvis, gridiron football player
Aaric Murray, basketball player
Bernard Pierce, NFL player for the Jacksonville Jaguars and Baltimore Ravens.
Corde Fitzhugh
Alexander McClay Williams, wrongful execution victim

See also

Aston Bulls

References

External links
 Glen Mills Schools official website

Educational institutions established in 1826
Schools in Delaware County, Pennsylvania
1826 establishments in Pennsylvania
Juvenile detention centers in the United States
Therapeutic boarding schools in the United States